Tucson is an unincorporated community in Ross County, in the U.S. state of Ohio.

History
A post office called Tucson was established in 1890, and remained in operation until 1907. Besides post office, Tucson had a gristmill, built in 1842, and a country store.

References

Unincorporated communities in Ross County, Ohio
Unincorporated communities in Ohio